Miss Cameroon or Miss Cameroun is a national Beauty pageant in Cameroon where the winner is sent to Miss World. The current Miss Cameroon 2022 is Julia Samantha Edima of Mannequin.

History
In 2002 the Committee of Miss Cameroon (COMICA) established Miss Cameroon pageant in Yaounde. The main winner represents all women across the country to celebrate once year in her beauty, intelligence and values. Since 2013 Miss Cameroon will also participate at the Miss World beauty pageant after doing some social projects in her country. Miss Cameroon today's concept is all about supporting a dissemination of Cameroonian culture. The Main Miss Cameroon represents her country to the Miss World.

In 2020 Cameroon debuted at Miss Universe and the official winner, Angèle Kossinda has officially designated as the first Miss Universe Cameroon 2020.

Titleholders

Wins by region

Titleholders under Comité d'organisation Miss Cameroun
Cameroon has been represented in the Big Four international beauty pageants, the four major international beauty pageants for women. These are Miss World, Miss Universe, Miss International and Miss Earth.

Miss Universe Cameroon

The Miss Universe Cameroon represents her country at the Miss Universe. The winner of this title designates from former Miss Cameroun winners or experienced queens. On occasion, when the winner does not qualify (due to age) for either contest, a runner-up is sent.

Miss World Cameroon

The Miss Cameroun represents her country at the Miss World. On occasion, when the winner does not qualify (due to age) for either contest, a runner-up is sent.

Miss Earth Cameroon

References

External links
misscameroun.net

Beauty pageants in Cameroon
Entertainment events in Cameroon
Recurring events established in 2002
2002 establishments in Cameroon
Annual events in Cameroon
Cameroonian awards